Panagiotis Mouzourakis (born 24 May 1979) is a Greek singer, songwriter, actor and artist. He is known for his participation in the Greek television series, Singles and 4.

References

External links
 

1979 births
Living people
21st-century Greek male singers
Singers from Thessaloniki